A nuclear isomer is a metastable state of an atomic nucleus, in which one or more nucleons (protons or neutrons) occupy higher energy levels than in the ground state of the same nucleus. "Metastable" describes nuclei whose excited states have half-lives 100 to 1000 times longer than the half-lives of the excited nuclear states that decay with a "prompt" half life (ordinarily on the order of 10−12 seconds). The term "metastable" is usually restricted to isomers with half-lives of 10−9 seconds or longer. Some references recommend 5 × 10−9 seconds to distinguish the metastable half life from the normal "prompt" gamma-emission half-life. Occasionally the half-lives are far longer than this and can last minutes, hours, or years. For example, the  nuclear isomer survives so long (at least 1015 years) that it has never been observed to decay spontaneously.

Sometimes, the gamma decay from a metastable state is referred to as isomeric transition, but this process typically resembles shorter-lived gamma decays in all external aspects with the exception of the long-lived nature of the meta-stable parent nuclear isomer. The longer lives of nuclear isomers' metastable states are often due to the larger degree of nuclear spin change which must be involved in their gamma emission to reach the ground state. This high spin change causes these decays to be forbidden transitions and delayed. Delays in emission are caused by low or high available decay energy.

The first nuclear isomer and decay-daughter system (uranium X2/uranium Z, now known as /) was discovered by Otto Hahn in 1921.

Nuclei of nuclear isomers
The nucleus of a nuclear isomer occupies a higher energy state than the non-excited nucleus existing in the ground state. In an excited state, one or more of the protons or neutrons in a nucleus occupy a nuclear orbital of higher energy than an available nuclear orbital. These states are analogous to excited states of electrons in atoms.

When excited atomic states decay, energy is released by fluorescence. In electronic transitions, this process usually involves emission of light near the visible range. The amount of energy released is related to bond-dissociation energy or ionization energy and is usually in the range of a few to few tens of eV per bond. However, a much stronger type of binding energy, the nuclear binding energy, is involved in nuclear processes. Due to this, most nuclear excited states decay by gamma ray emission.

Nuclear isomers have long half-lives because their gamma decay is "forbidden" from the large change in nuclear spin needed to emit a gamma ray.

While most metastable isomers decay through gamma-ray emission, they can also decay through internal conversion. During internal conversion, energy of nuclear de-excitation is not emitted as a gamma ray, but is instead used to accelerate one of the inner electrons of the atom. These excited electrons then leave at a high speed. This occurs because inner atomic electrons penetrate the nucleus where they are subject to the intense electric fields created when the protons of the nucleus re-arrange in a different way.

In nuclei that are far from stability in energy, even more decay modes are known.

After fission, several of the fission fragments that may be produced have a metastable isomeric state. These fragments are usually produced in a highly excited state, in terms of energy and angular momentum, and go through a prompt de-excitation. At the end of this process, the nuclei can populate both the ground and the isomeric states. If the half-life of the isomers is long enough, it is possible to  measure their production rate and compare it to the one of the ground state, calculating the so-called isomeric yield ratio.

Metastable isomers
Metastable isomers can be produced through nuclear fusion or other nuclear reactions. A nucleus produced this way generally starts its existence in an excited state that relaxes through the emission of one or more gamma rays or conversion electrons. Sometimes the de-excitation does not completely proceed rapidly to the nuclear ground state. This usually occurs when the formation of an intermediate excited state has a spin far different from that of the ground state. Gamma-ray emission is hindered if the spin of the post-emission state differs greatly from that of the emitting state, especially if the excitation energy is low. The excited state in this situation is a good candidate to be metastable if there are no other states of intermediate spin with excitation energies less than that of the metastable state.

Metastable isomers of a particular isotope are usually designated with an "m". This designation is placed after the mass number of the atom; for example, cobalt-58m1 is abbreviated , where 27 is the atomic number of cobalt. For isotopes with more than one metastable isomer, "indices" are placed after the designation, and the labeling becomes m1, m2, m3, and so on. Increasing indices, m1, m2, etc., correlate with increasing levels of excitation energy stored in each of the isomeric states (e.g., hafnium-178m2, or ).

A different kind of metastable nuclear state (isomer) is the fission isomer or shape isomer. Most actinide nuclei in their ground states are not spherical, but rather prolate spheroidal, with an axis of symmetry longer than the other axes, similar to an American football or rugby ball. This geometry can result in quantum-mechanical states where the distribution of protons and neutrons is so much further from spherical geometry that de-excitation to the nuclear ground state is strongly hindered. In general, these states either de-excite to the ground state far more slowly than a "usual" excited state, or they undergo spontaneous fission with half-lives of the order of nanoseconds or microseconds—a very short time, but many orders of magnitude longer than the half-life of a more usual nuclear excited state.

Nearly stable isomers
Most nuclear excited states are very unstable and "immediately" radiate away the extra energy after existing on the order of 10−12 seconds. As a result, the characterization "nuclear isomer" is usually applied only to configurations with half-lives of 10−9 seconds or longer. Quantum mechanics predicts that certain atomic species should possess isomers with unusually long lifetimes even by this stricter standard and have interesting properties. Some nuclear isomers are so long-lived that they are relatively stable and can be produced and observed in quantity.

Its half-life is at least 1015 years, markedly longer than the age of the universe. The low excitation energy of the isomeric state causes both gamma de-excitation to the  ground state (which itself is radioactive by beta decay, with a half-life of only 8 hours) and direct beta decay to hafnium or tungsten to be suppressed due to spin mismatches. The origin of this isomer is mysterious, though it is believed to have been formed in supernovae (as are most other heavy elements). Were it to relax to its ground state, it would release a photon with a photon energy of 75 keV.

It was first reported in 1988 by C. B. Collins that theoretically  can be forced to release its energy by weaker X-rays, although at that time this de-excitation mechanism had never been observed.

 is another reasonably stable nuclear isomer. It possesses a half-life of 31 years and the highest excitation energy of any comparably long-lived isomer. Due to this, the substance is being studied as a possible source for gamma-ray lasers. These reports indicate that the energy is released very quickly, so that  can produce extremely high powers (on the order of exawatts). Other isomers have also been investigated as possible media for gamma-ray stimulated emission.

Holmium's nuclear isomer  has a half-life of 1,200 years, which is nearly the longest half-life of any holmium radionuclide. Only , with a half-life of 4,570 years, is more stable.

 has a remarkably low-lying metastable isomer, estimated at only 8.28 ± 0.17 eV above the ground state. After years of failure and one notable false alarm, this decay was directly observed in 2016, based on its internal conversion decay. This direct detection allowed for a first measurement of the isomer's lifetime under internal-conversion decay, the determination of the isomer's magnetic dipole and electric quadrupole moment via spectroscopy of the electronic shell and an improved measurement of the excitation energy. Due to its low energy, the isomer is expected to allow for direct nuclear laser spectroscopy and the development of a nuclear clock of unprecedented accuracy.

High-spin suppression of decay
The most common mechanism for suppression of gamma decay of excited nuclei, and thus the existence of a metastable isomer, is lack of a decay route for the excited state that will change nuclear angular momentum along any given direction by the most common amount of 1 quantum unit ħ in the spin angular momentum. This change is necessary to emit a gamma photon, which has a spin of 1 unit in this system. Integral changes of 2 and more units in angular momentum are possible, but the emitted photons carry off the additional angular momentum. Changes of more than 1 unit are known as forbidden transitions. Each additional unit of spin change larger than 1 that the emitted gamma ray must carry inhibits decay rate by about 5 orders of magnitude. The highest known spin change of 8 units occurs in the decay of 180mTa, which suppresses its decay by a factor of 1035 from that associated with 1 unit. Instead of a natural gamma-decay half-life of 10−12 seconds, it has a half-life of more than 1023 seconds, or at least 3 × 1015 years, and thus has yet to be observed to decay.

Gamma emission is impossible when the nucleus begins in a zero-spin state, as such an emission would not conserve angular momentum.

Applications
Hafnium isomers (mainly 178m2Hf) have been considered as weapons that could be used to circumvent the Nuclear Non-Proliferation Treaty, since it is claimed that they can be induced to emit very strong gamma radiation. This claim is generally discounted. DARPA had a program to investigate this use of both nuclear isomers. The potential to trigger an abrupt release of energy from nuclear isotopes, a prerequisite to their use in such weapons, is disputed. Nonetheless a 12-member Hafnium Isomer Production Panel (HIPP) was created in 2003 to assess means of mass-producing the isotope.

Nuclear batteries

Nuclear batteries use small amounts (milligrams and microcuries) of radioisotopes with high energy densities. In one betavoltaic device design, radioactive material sits atop a device with adjacent layers of P-type and N-type silicon. Ionizing radiation directly penetrates the junction and creates electron–hole pairs. Nuclear isomers could replace other isotopes, and with further development, it may be possible to turn them on and off by triggering decay as needed. Current candidates for such use include 108Ag, 166Ho, 177Lu, and 242Am.  As of 2004, the only successfully triggered isomer was 180mTa, which required more photon energy to trigger than was released.

An isotope such as 177Lu releases gamma rays by decay through a series of internal energy levels within the nucleus, and it is thought that by learning the triggering cross sections with sufficient accuracy, it may be possible to create energy stores that are 106 times more concentrated than high explosive or other traditional chemical energy storage.

Decay processes
An isomeric transition or internal transition (IT) is the decay of a nuclear isomer to a lower-energy nuclear state. The actual process has two types (modes):
 γ (gamma ray) emission (emission of a high-energy photon),
 internal conversion (the energy is used to eject one of the atom's electrons).
Isomers may decay into other elements, though the rate of decay may differ between isomers. For example, 177mLu can beta-decay to 177Hf with a half-life of 160.4 d, or it can undergo isomeric transition to 177Lu with a half-life of 160.4 d, which then beta-decays to 177Hf with a half-life of 6.68 d.

The emission of a gamma ray from an excited nuclear state allows the nucleus to lose energy and reach a lower-energy state, sometimes its ground state. In certain cases, the excited nuclear state following a nuclear reaction or other type of radioactive decay can become a metastable nuclear excited state. Some nuclei are able to stay in this metastable excited state for minutes, hours, days, or occasionally far longer.

The process of isomeric transition is similar to gamma emission from any excited nuclear state, but differs by involving excited metastable states of nuclei with longer half-lives.  As with other excited states, the nucleus can be left in an isomeric state following the emission of an alpha particle, beta particle, or some other type of particle.

The gamma ray may transfer its energy directly to one of the most tightly bound electrons, causing that electron to be ejected from the atom, a process termed the photoelectric effect. This should not be confused with the internal conversion process, in which no gamma-ray photon is produced as an intermediate particle.

See also
Induced gamma emission
Isomeric shift

References

External links
Research group which presented initial claims of hafnium nuclear isomer de-excitation control. – The Center for Quantum Electronics, The University of Texas at Dallas.
JASON Defense Advisory Group report on high energy nuclear materials mentioned in the Washington Post story above
 login required?
Confidence for Hafnium Isomer Triggering in 2006. – The Center for Quantum Electronics, The University of Texas at Dallas.
Reprints of articles about nuclear isomers in peer reviewed journals. – The Center for Quantum Electronics, The University of Texas at Dallas.

Isomer, nuclear